Mihailo Rašković (Titel, Austria-Hungary, 1827 - Belgrade, Principality of Serbia, 3 October 1872) was a chemist, professor at the Belgrade Lyceum and the Visoka škola. he is best remembered in Serbia as one of the fathers of modern Chemistry along with Sima Lozanić and Marko Leko.

Rašković was a corresponding member of the Serbian Learned Society and a regular member since 13 January 1857. He was also a corresponding member of the Serbian Royal Academy: a regular member of the Department of Science and Mathematics, appointed  29 July 1864. Secretary of the Department of Science, Science and Mathematics (SUD) in 1867 and 1868.

Biography
Educated in Budapest, Prague, Chemnitz and Pšibran, where Mihailo Rašković studied to obtain his doctorate in chemistry. He was the first professor of chemistry educated abroad on the staff of the Belgrade Lyceum, the then highest learning institution in the Principality of Serbia, which eventually became the University of Belgrade.

It was in Kragujevac that the Lycée was founded in 1838 and initially had two departments: Philosophy and Jurisprudence, and in Belgrade, in 1853 a new Natural and Technical Department was established, where chemistry began to be studied. That same year, Mihailo Rašković began to teach inorganic and organic chemistry and chemical technology and to hold experiments and exercises in the chemical laboratory, which he founded also in the same year. Rašković's laboratory was initially called Chemical Workshop but the name was changed to Chemical Laboratory when the Belgrade Lyceum was turned into the Grandes écoles in 1863 and was moved from the Residence of Princess Ljubica to the Captain Miša's Mansion. The name remained until 1906 when the laboratory was renamed Hemijski zavod (institute) and later Hemijski Institut (Chemical Institute), its current name.

Although Rašković was not involved in research due to lack of resources, he did prepare the foundations " for the years to come. He established and introduced the first consistent chemical terminology in Serbia".

Together with Sima Lozanić and Marko Leko, Mihailo Rašković is remembered as one of the most important names in chemical science in Serbia, that is, in the period before the founding of the University of Belgrade in 1905.

After his death, in 1872, Sima Lozanić succeeded him as a professor of chemistry.

Sources
 Miloje Sarić (1996), "Life and work of Serbian scientists", Belgrade: SANU. .

External links
P vip.svg Portal Biography
Biography on the SANU website

See also
 Milan Nedeljković
 Aleksandar Popović Sandor

References 

People from Titel
People from Belgrade
1872 deaths
1827 births
Serbian chemists
Academic staff of the Lyceum of the Principality of Serbia
Members of the Serbian Learned Society